Brandon Beal (born December 16, 1983) is an American singer, songwriter and producer. He gained recognition through his single "Twerk It Like Miley" which went viral through the app Dubsmash, and charted in 14 different countries including Denmark, Indonesia, and Malaysia. He later released the single "Golden" that featured Lukas Graham which also reached number 1 in Denmark, and charted in Sweden, Norway, and Germany. He also hit the number 1 spot in Denmark with the Christopher song "CPH Girls" that featured him.

Career
Beal gained his first musical recognition through his independent album Comfortable released in 2006, (a collaboration with Danish/American producer Multiman). Brandon Beal has worked with artists like Snoop Dogg, Flo Rida, Juelz Santana, Kato, Lukas Graham and Christopher.

In February 2011, Beal and Rasmus Hedegaard, also known as Beal & Ras toured Denmark with Kato and Ida Corr. Their first single "Money" stayed on the Danish Dance charts for 14 weeks peaking at No. 13. They released their second single "I Like It" featuring Troo.L.S on August 18, 2011.

Beal was featured on "My House 2.0" on Kato's album Discolized 2.0. The song peaked at No. 40 on Hitlisten without being an official single. He is also featured on Kato's single "Never Let U Go" that also features Snoop Dogg. The single debuted at No. 2 on Hitlisten in its first week of release.

He also worked alongside Danish singer and band Lukas Graham on their album, which was No. 1 on the album charts for 11 weeks, and to date has gone 3× platinum. On October 22, 2012, Lukas Graham released the single "Better Than Yourself" which was also co-written by Brandon. This song debuted at No. 1 on Hitlisten, and is his biggest selling single to date.

In 2014, he released the song "Twerk It Like Miley" produced by Hedegaard and featuring 
Danish singer Christopher. The single reached number one on Tracklisten, the official Danish singles chart and later received a Danish Music Award for "Club Hit of the Year".

In 2016, Beal released the single "Golden" featuring vocals by Lukas Graham. It reached number 1 on Hitlisen, the official Danish Singles Chart becoming his third number 1 in Denmark after "Twerk It Like Miley" and "CPH Girls".

Discography

Albums

Singles

Featured in

Awards and nominations

References

External links 
Official website
Music Exclusives Interview Brandon Beal Interview: June 2010 « MusicXclusives.com | "We Play It First"

1983 births
Living people
People from Tyler, Texas
Singers from Texas
American contemporary R&B singers
21st-century American male singers
21st-century American singers
American emigrants to Denmark